Punk Goes Acoustic is the third album in the Punk Goes... series and the first installment in the Punk Goes Acoustic series created by Fearless Records. It contains a collection of both previously released and unreleased songs by various artists performing acoustically. It was packaged with a bonus CD showcasing acts on the Fearless and Victory record labels. The album was released on October 21, 2003. This was the first Punk Goes... album to deviate from the theme of performing cover songs, though it was not the first to feature an original song, following The Aquabats "Why Rock?" on Punk Goes Metal. As of 2019, there are a total of three albums in the franchise.

Track listing

Bonus CD
"Onto Morning Stars" – Anatomy of a Ghost (Fearless Records)
"Still Standing" – Rock Kills Kid (Fearless Records)
"New Way to Dance" – The Kinison (Fearless Records)
"Anything" – Plain White T's (Fearless Records)
"Taking It All Back" – Count the Stars (Victory Records)
"Shevanel Take 2" – Between the Buried and Me (Victory Records)
"I Loved the Way She Said L.A." – Spitalfield (Victory Records)
"Giving Up" – Silverstein (Victory Records)

References

Covers albums
Punk Goes series
2003 compilation albums